Hlyniany is a small city in Lviv Raion, Lviv Oblast (region) of Ukraine. It hosts the administration of Hlyniany urban hromada, one of the hromadas of Ukraine. Population: .

History 

In 1340, together with whole Red Ruthenia, Hlyniany became part of the Kingdom of Poland, where it remained until 1772 (see Partitions of Poland). The village, called Gliniany, belonged to Lwow Land of the Ruthenian Voivodeship. It received a town charter in 1397, from Voivode of Sandomierz and Starosta of Red Ruthenia, Jan z Tarnowa. In 1425, King Wladyslaw Jagiello confirmed Gliniany's charter. In summer 1537, it was one of centers of the so-called Chicken War. 

In 1772 Gliniany became part of Austria's province of Galicia, in the Bezirkshauptmannshaft (District) of Przemyslany where it remained until late 1918. In the interbellum period, it belonged to the Second Polish Republic, as part of Przemyslany County, Tarnopol Voivodeship. 

The Jewish population was 2,418 in 1910. 

Until 18 July 2020, Hlyniany belonged to Zolochiv Raion. In July 2020, as part of the administrative reform of Ukraine, which reduced the number of raions of Lviv Oblast to seven, Hlyniany was transferred to Lviv Raion.

See also
 Hlyniany Gate

References 

Cities in Lviv Oblast
Cities of district significance in Ukraine
Ruthenian Voivodeship